Agriocnemis palaeforma is a species of damselfly in the family Coenagrionidae. It is found in Uganda and possibly Cameroon. Its natural habitats are swamps, freshwater marshes, and intermittent freshwater marshes. It is threatened by habitat loss.

References

Coenagrionidae
Insects described in 1959
Taxonomy articles created by Polbot